Mohammad Rajablou (born 6 April 1985) is an Iranian cyclist.

Major results

2007
 1st Stage 6 Tour of Iran (Azerbaijan)
2010
 8th Overall International Presidency Tour
2012
 3rd Overall Tour of Vietnam
2016
 1st Stage 4 Tour of Japan
 6th Overall Tour de Singkarak
2017
 2nd National Road Race Championships
 2nd National Time Trial Championships
 9th Road race, Asian Road Championships
2018
 2nd Team time trial, Asian Road Championships

References

1985 births
Living people
Iranian male cyclists
Cyclists at the 2014 Asian Games
Cyclists at the 2018 Asian Games
Asian Games competitors for Iran
People from Bukan
21st-century Iranian people